Emily's Sassy Lime (a palindrome) was an American punk rock group from Southern California. The group was formed in 1993 by three Asian American teenagers: sisters Wendy Yao and Amy Yao, and their friend Emily Ryan.

History
Emily's Sassy Lime formed in 1993 after the teen girls sneaked out of their homes one night to see a Bikini Kill and Bratmobile show, striking up a correspondence with Molly Neuman, the drummer of the latter band. As first generation Asian American girls in a punk band, they faced contradictions in expectations. They did not live very close to each other and did not own cars, so they often had to write their songs over the phone, sometimes leaving seminal ideas for tunes, jingles, and melodies on each other's answering machines. When they finally did have a chance to record, they did so on a 'singalodeon', a cheap off-the-shelf lo-fi tape recorder. They barely ever practiced (often forbidden from doing so by their parents who considered their studies a bigger priority), making their sound a random, spontaneous indie garage punk-noise collage of "Whatever, just play." They didn't have their own instruments for years, so with every show they played, they had to borrow someone else's in the DIY punk spirit of sharing, often swapping with each other carelessly and making every show sound totally different.

In 1995, they all appeared as dancers in the Kathi Wilcox-directed "Mad Doctor" video for The PeeChees. Emily's Sassy Lime broke up in 1997, not long after they graduated from high school and attended separate colleges. Amy Yao went to Art Center College of Design, Wendy Yao headed off to Stanford University, and Emily Ryan attended University of Southern California. The group are often considered an essential early riot grrrl band.

Later activities
In 2000, they all participated in the very first Ladyfest in Olympia, the Yao sisters collaborating with Sharon Cheslow in the experimental sound installation performance art project of Coterie Exchange, during an art exhibit curated by Audrey Marrs. In 2003, Emily Ryan starred in one of Jon Moritsugu's critically acclaimed no budget guerrilla underground punk films called Scumrock. Amy Yao has been involved over the years with several different bands, frequently collaborating with Tobi Vail, co-founded China Art Objects Galleries, and completed her MFA in sculpture at the Yale School of Art. Wendy Yao owned and ran a shop and DIY indie-punk artist space in Los Angeles's downtown Chinatown neighborhood called Ooga Booga for 15 years. The Yao sisters later played in a band with Layla Gibbon of Skinned Teen named Shady Ladies.

Discography

LPs
Desperate, Scared But Social, LP, KRS Records, 1995

Singles
"Summer Vacation", 7", Xmas Records, 1994
"Dippity Do-nut", 7", KRS Records, 1996

Compilations
"Right Is Here", LP/CD, Xmas Records, 1995

Compilation appearances
A Slice of Lemon, LP, Lookout Records/KRS, 1995

References

External links
Emily Ryan interview, 2009
Wendy Yao interview, 2012
Wendy Yao and Amy Yao interview, 2013, Art Papers

1993 establishments in California
All-female punk bands
Garage rock groups from California
American musicians of Asian descent
American noise rock music groups
Garage punk groups
Kill Rock Stars
Indie rock musical groups from California
Musical groups established in 1993
Musical groups from Los Angeles
Punk rock groups from California
Riot grrrl bands